Kigumo Constituency is an electoral constituency in Kenya. It is one of the seven districts of Muranga County. It was previously one of three constituencies in the former Maragua District, Central Province. The constituency was established for the 1963 elections.

Members of Parliament

Wards 

The constituency has four wards, all electing members for the Murang'a County Assembly.

References 

Constituencies in Murang'a County
Constituencies in Central Province (Kenya)
1963 establishments in Kenya
Constituencies established in 1963